William Logan (December 8, 1776August 8, 1822) was a United States Senator from Kentucky.

Born within the fort at Harrodsburg, Logan spent his early childhood in St. Asaphs Fort, receiving private instruction from his parents and tutors. He moved to Shelby County about 1798. He studied law, was admitted to the bar, and practiced. He was delegate to Kentucky's constitutional convention in 1799 and worked as a state commissioner in siting the new Barren County's seat of government (at Glasgow, a new settlement probably named for the Scottish hometown of Logan's father) the same year.

Logan was a member of the Kentucky House of Representatives from 1803 to 1806 and again in 1808, and served as speaker two terms. He was a judge of the court of appeals from 1808 to 1812. He was also a presidential elector in 1808, 1812, and 1816. Logan was elected as a Democratic Republican to the United States Senate and served from March 4, 1819 to May 28, 1820 when he resigned to run for governor in 1820. (He did not succeed, instead serving as a commissioner of the Kentucky River Company.) Logan died at his residence in Shelby County and was interred in the Logan family burial ground near Shelbyville.

References

 

1776 births
1822 deaths
American people of Scottish descent
United States senators from Kentucky
Members of the Kentucky House of Representatives
Speakers of the Kentucky House of Representatives
Kentucky lawyers
Democratic-Republican Party United States senators
Kentucky Democratic-Republicans
People from Harrodsburg, Kentucky
19th-century American lawyers